This is a list of child actors from the Republic of Ireland. Films and/or television series they appeared in are mentioned only if they were still a child at the time of filming.

Current child actors (under the age of eighteen) are indicated by boldface.

B
Emma Bolger (born 1996)
In America (2002)
Intermission (2003)
Heidi (2005)
Sarah Bolger (born 1991)
In America (2002)
Tara Road (2005)
Stormbreaker (2006)
The Spiderwick Chronicles (2007)
The Tudors (2008)
The Fence (2009)

E
Elizabeth Rebecca Edwin (c. 1771-1854), made her stage debut at age 8 in Dublin.

G
Jack Gleeson (born 1992)
Batman Begins (2005)
Shrooms (2007)
A Shine of Rainbows (2009)

L
Evanna Lynch (born 1991)
Harry Potter and the Order of the Phoenix (2007)
Harry Potter and the Half-Blood Prince (2009)
Harry Potter and the Deathly Hallows – Part 1 (2010)
Harry Potter and the Deathly Hallows – Part 2 (2011)

M
Devon Murray (born 1988)
Angela's Ashes (1999)
 Harry Potter film series (2001–2011)

P
Susie Power (born 2003)
 Fair City (2015-2017)
 Little Roy (2015-2017)
 A Date for Mad Mary (2016)

R
Saoirse Ronan (born 1994)
Atonement (2007)
I Could Never Be Your Woman (2007)
Death Defying Acts (2008)
City of Ember (2008)
The Lovely Bones (2009)
Hanna (2011)

V
Sophie Vavasseur (born 1992)
Evelyn (2002)
Resident Evil: Apocalypse (2004)
Northanger Abbey (2007)
Becoming Jane (2007)
The Old Curiosity Shop (2007)
Exorcismus  (2010)

List
Ireland